The men's large hill individual ski jumping competition for the 1994 Winter Olympics was held in Lysgårdsbakken. It occurred on 20 February.

Results

References

Ski jumping at the 1994 Winter Olympics